Kang Da-hyun is a South Korean actress and model. She is known for her roles in dramas such as Dokgo Rewind, My Healing Love and Tale of Fairy. She also appeared in movies Along with the Gods: The Two Worlds, Puzzle and Roman Holiday.

Biography and career
She was born on September 6, 1992, in South Korea. She attended Dankook University, she studied Imagery. She joined Redline Entertainment in 2017 after she graduated. She made her debut as an actress in 2017, she appeared in drama Hospital Ship as Kwak Ji-eun. After that she appeared in several television dramas such as Dokgo Rewind, Tale of Fairy and My Healing Love. She also appeared in a number of movies, Along with the Gods: The Two Worlds, Puzzle and Roman Holiday.

Filmography

Film

Television series

Web series

References

External links
 
 

1992 births
Living people
21st-century South Korean actresses
South Korean female models
South Korean television actresses
South Korean film actresses